Drometrizole trisiloxane (INCI) is a lipophilic benzotriazole derivative marketed as Mexoryl XL by L'Oréal and is used in sunscreens to absorb UV radiation. It is a broad-spectrum UV absorber with two absorption peaks, one at 303 nm (UVB) and one at 344 nm (UVA). Just like Mexoryl SX (ecamsule), it is used exclusively in products by L'Oréal owned brands. Drometrizole trisiloxane and ecamsule are often used together, because they show a synergistic effect in protection.

Availability
Sunscreens with drometrizole trisiloxane are approved within the EU, Canada, Australia, Japan, and other countries, but not in the United States.

References 

Benzotriazoles
Phenols
Siloxanes
Sunscreening agents